Chris Wright is a visual anthropologist  holding the position of lecturer at Goldsmiths College,  and professor at the Free University of Berlin. Wright originally trained as an artist before becoming Photographic Archivist at the Royal Anthropological Institute in 1992. He has published on a number of topics including the relationship between art and anthropology and photography in the Solomon Islands.

References

British anthropologists
Living people
Year of birth missing (living people)
Place of birth missing (living people)
Academic staff of the Free University of Berlin
Academics of Goldsmiths, University of London